A cornicen (plural cornicines) was a junior officer in the Roman army. The cornicen'''s job was to signal salutes to officers and sound orders to the legions. The cornicines played the cornu (making him an aeneator). Cornicines always marched at the head of the centuries, with the tesserary and the signifer. The cornicines were also used as assistants to a centurion (like an optio). The cornicen was a duplicary or a soldier who got double the basic pay of the legionary.

The cornicen

The late Roman writer Vegetius in his work De re militari'' wrote:

See also
 Music of ancient Rome

References
Vegetius
De re militari, Vegetius, Book II
Roman Empire

Military ranks of ancient Rome
Ancient Roman music